Julia Degan (born 19 January 1981) is a female Australian long-distance runner. She competed in the marathon event at the 2015 World Championships in Athletics in Beijing, China.

See also
 Australia at the 2015 World Championships in Athletics

References

1981 births
Living people
Australian female long-distance runners
Place of birth missing (living people)
World Athletics Championships athletes for Australia
20th-century Australian women
21st-century Australian women